Benjamin Jester Lyons (April 1, 1882 – death date unknown) was an American Negro league first baseman in the 1910s.

A native of Indianapolis, Indiana, Lyons was the brother of fellow Negro leaguer Jimmie Lyons. Older brother Bennie made his Negro leagues debut in 1911 with the West Baden Sprudels. He went on to play for the French Lick Plutos and Indianapolis ABCs in 1912 and 1913.

References

External links
 and Seamheads

1882 births
Place of death missing
Year of death missing
French Lick Plutos players
Indianapolis ABCs players
West Baden Sprudels players
Baseball first basemen
Baseball players from Indianapolis